The 2003 Arizona Diamondbacks looked to improve on their 98–64 record from 2002. They looked to contend in what was once again a strong National League West Division. They finished the season with a record of 84–78, good enough for third place in the division.

Offseason
 December 15, 2002: Erubiel Durazo was traded by the Diamondbacks to the Oakland Athletics as part of a 4-team trade. The Cincinnati Reds sent Elmer Dessens and cash to the Diamondbacks. The Toronto Blue Jays sent Felipe López to the Reds. The Athletics sent a player to be named later to the Blue Jays. The Athletics completed the deal by sending Jason Arnold (minors) to the Blue Jays on December 16.
 January 30, 2003: Ricky Bottalico was signed as a free agent by the Diamondbacks.
 February 14, 2003: Scott Service was signed as a free agent by the Diamondbacks.

Regular season
 September 19, 2003: Diamondbacks pitcher Randy Johnson hit a home run off of Milwaukee Brewers pitcher Doug Davis, his only home run in his MLB career.

Season standings

National League West

Record vs. opponents

Notable transactions
 June 3, 2003: 2003 Major League Baseball draft
 Conor Jackson was drafted by the Diamondbacks in the 1st round (19th pick). Player signed June 16, 2003.
 Carlos Quentin was drafted by the Diamondbacks in the 1st round (29th pick). Player signed July 2, 2003.
 June 16, 2003: Scott Service was selected off waivers from the Diamondbacks by the Toronto Blue Jays.
 June 29, 2003: Matt Williams was released by the Diamondbacks.
 July 29, 2003: David Dellucci, Bret Prinz, and John Prowl (minors) were traded by the Diamondbacks to the New York Yankees for Raúl Mondesí and cash.

Roster

Player stats

Batting

Starters by position
Note: Pos = Position; G = Games played; AB = At bats; H = Hits; Avg. = Batting average; HR = Home runs; RBI = Runs batted in

Other batters
Note: G = Games played; AB = At bats; H = Hits; Avg. = Batting average; HR = Home runs; RBI = Runs batted in

Pitching

Starting pitchers
Note: G = Games pitched; IP = Innings pitched; W = Wins; L = Losses; ERA = Earned run average; SO = Strikeouts

Other pitchers
Note: G = Games pitched; IP = Innings pitched; W = Wins; L = Losses; ERA = Earned run average; SO = Strikeouts

Relief pitchers
Note: G = Games pitched; W = Wins; L = Losses; SV = Saves; ERA = Earned run average; SO = Strikeouts

Farm system

References

External links
 2003 Arizona Diamondbacks team page at Baseball Reference
 2003 Arizona Diamondbacks team page at www.baseball-almanac.com

Arizona Diamondbacks Season, 2003
Arizona Diamondbacks seasons
Arizonia